Vehicle registration plates of Lebanon have a blue bar to the left like in EU countries (without the 12 golden stars) if the plate is wide and to the top if the plate is a normal rectangle. The blue bar consists the name of the country in Arabic, the Lebanese Cedar in the middle and the vehicle's classification all in white. The rest of the plate is white, with a Latin letter representing the vehicle's registration area and Arabic numbers next to the letter in bold. Red ones are used by taxis and public transport, and green ones are for rental vehicles, 

If the plate has the letter J, then the car is owned by a judge. If the plate has the letters AP or AG then the car belongs to a minister or parliament member.

Codes 
The following style is X 999999 with numbers followed with Latin letters. X is town registered to:

Gallery

See also

Driving licence in Lebanon
Lebanese identity card

Lebanon